('right of the lord'), also known as  ('right of the first night'), was a supposed legal right in medieval Europe, allowing feudal lords to have sexual relations with subordinate women, in particular, on the wedding nights of the women.

A majority of historians have concluded that the idea is a myth and that all references to it are from later periods. Over the centuries, it became commonly portrayed in European literature as a practice that had occurred in earlier times or other places. In practice, it may have been the feudal lords using their power and influence over serfs to sexually exploit the women free of consequences, as opposed to a legitimate legal right.

Terminology 

Ancient times 
In the Epic of Gilgamesh, Gilgamesh is described as having practiced a similar custom: "He is king, he does whatever he wants... takes the girl from her mother and uses her, the warrior's daughter, the young man's bride." His first meeting with his friend Enkidu is an attempt at one of these acts where Enkidu manages to stop him in a great contest of strength between the two champions.

Herodotus mentions a similar custom among the Adyrmachidae in ancient Libya: "They are also the only tribe with whom the custom obtains of bringing all women about to become brides before the king, that he may choose such as are agreeable to him."

It is also mentioned in the Babylonian Talmud, Tractate Ketubot 3b תיבעל להגמון (tibael lehegmon).

Middle Ages

Europe 

Alternatively, it has been interpreted as compensation to the lord for the young women leaving his lands. Encyclopedia Britannica states that the evidence indicates it was a monetary tax related to vassal marriages, since a considerable number of seigneurial rights revolved around marriage.

However, according to British scholar W. D. Howarth, the Roman Catholic Church at some times prohibited consummation of a marriage on the first night. The payment was for an indulgence from the church to waive this prohibition.

The biography of Gerald of Aurillac written by Odo of Cluny (879–942) gives an account of the young nobleman demanding to rape one of his serfs, only to have the act averted by a miracle, sending Gerald on the road to sainthood. American historian Vern Bullough suggested that this illustrates that such behaviour was commonplace in the period, and that the "legend [of ] reflected the reality".

In the 14th-century French epic poem , a tyrannical lord claims the  unless he receives part of the bride's dowry.

China

Khitan 
Before the Jurchens overthrew their Khitan rulers, married Jurchen women and Jurchen girls were raped by Liao dynasty Khitan envoys as a custom which caused resentment by the Jurchens against the Khitan. Liao Khitan envoys among the Jurchens were treated to guest prostitutes by their Jurchen hosts. Unmarried Jurchen girls and their families hosted the Liao envoys who had sex with the girls. Song envoys among the Jin were similarly entertained by singing girls in Guide, Henan.

Although the Liao Khitan had superior power over the Jurchens when ruling them, there is no evidence that guest prostitution of unmarried Jurchen girls to Khitan men was hated or resented by the Jurchens. It was only when the Liao Khitan forced aristocratic Jurchen families to give up their beautiful wives as guest prostitutes to Liao Khitan messengers that this stirred resentment and anger by the Jurchens.

A historian has speculated that this could mean that in Jurchen upper classes, only a husband had the right to his married wife while among lower class Jurchens, unmarried girls virginity and sleeping with Liao Khitan men did not matter and did not impede their ability to marry later.

The Jurchens' sexual habits and mores seemed lax to Han Chinese, such as marrying with an in law which was one of China's "Ten Heinous Crimes". Jurchens very commonly practiced guest prostitution giving female companions, food and shelter to guests. Unmarried daughters of Jurchen families of lower and middle classes in native Jurchen villages were provided to Liao Kitan messengers for sexual intercourse as recorded by Hong Hao (Hung Hao).

Marco Polo also reported that in Hami (Camul) guest prostitution was practiced with hosts giving their female relatives, sisters, daughters and wives to guests in their house. Tanguts practiced this guest prostitution.

Xia 
In the Western Xia state, before they could marry men of their own ethnicity when they reached 30 years old, Uighur women in Shaanxi in the 12th century had children after having relations with multiple Han Chinese men.

Later references

Europe

England 
In Shakespeare's play, Henry VI, Part 2, the rebel Jack Cade proclaims: "there shall not a maid be married, but she shall pay to me her maidenhead ere they have it". According to the French scholar Alain Boureau, Cade was demanding the payment of merchet, not the right of first night, but others disagree.

The Curiosities of Literature (1823) by the British writer Isaac D'Israeli stated the practice had been widespread across Europe.

France 

The French writer Antoine du Verdier also commented on it in 1577.

The French philosopher Montesquieu referred to the practice in The Spirit of the Laws (1748), saying that it had been enforced in France over three nights.

Voltaire mentioned the practice in his , published in 1764. This play was the first time the term  was used.

Holy Roman Empire 
In Mozart's The Marriage of Figaro, which premiered in 1786 with a libretto by Lorenzo Da Ponte, the comic plot revolves around the successful efforts of the young bride and groom, Figaro and Susanna, to block the efforts of the unfaithful Count Almaviva to seduce Susanna. To achieve his aim, the frustrated Count threatens to reinstitute . It was based on a play of the same title by Pierre Beaumarchais.

Netherlands 

Scotland 

In 1527, the Scottish historian Hector Boece wrote that the "right" had existed in Scotland until abolished by Malcolm III ( 1058–93) under the influence of his wife, Margaret (later St Margaret of Scotland). The payment of merchet was instituted in its place. Boece attributed the law to a legendary king, Ewen or Evenus III. The modern French scholar Alain Boureau says that Boece probably invented King Ewen, but he views this as mythology, not as a polemic against medieval barbarism.

Other Scottish scholars of his era quoted Boece with approval, including John Lesley (1578), George Buchanan (1582), and Habbakuk Bisset (1626). The historical existence of the custom in Scotland was also accepted in Scottish legal works such as James Balfour's Practicks, John Skene's  (1597), and Thomas Craig's  (1603). The English scholar Henry Spelman stated in his Glossary (1664) that the custom had existed in Scotland, but not in England. The English jurist William Blackstone cited Boece's statement in his Commentaries on the Laws of England (1765–1769), while similarly noting that the custom had never existed in England. In 1776, the Scottish jurist David Dalrymple disputed the existence of the custom, arguing Boece's account was purely legendary, but his position was often seen as based on Scottish patriotism. However, according to the Scottish legal scholar David Maxwell Walker, instances have been recorded of the  being claimed up to the 18th century. Walker concluded that it is possible that the  existed as a custom in Scotland, dependent on the attitude of the king, and survived longer in remote regions.

After their travels in Scotland in 1773, Samuel Johnson and James Boswell documented the custom of the payment of merchet, linking it with the "right of first night". They paralleled it with that custom of Borough English, suggesting that the English custom favored the youngest son because the paternity of the eldest son was doubtful. Sir Walter Scott mentioned the custom in his historical Scottish novel, The Fair Maid of Perth (1828).

Spain 
The Spanish novel  (1617) by Miguel de Cervantes contains an episode where a bride and groom escape a barbaric marriage custom in Ireland. However, Cervantes' story was a source for the English play The Custom of the Country, written by John Fletcher and Philip Massinger and published in 1647. The play has the classic version of the "right of first night" with money payment as an alternative. According to Howarth, this suggests that  was a familiar notion to people at that time, which he traces back to Boece.

Africa 
In modern times, Zaire's president Mobutu Sese Seko appropriated the  when traveling around the country, where local chiefs offered him virgins.

America 

The term has also been used to describe the sexual exploitation of slaves in the United States.

Asia 

Oceania 
In the Hawaiian Islands, the privilege for chiefs was often observed, according to "Sexual Behavior in Pre Contact Hawai'i" by Milton Diamond. A young girl's parents viewed the coupling with favor. This is because the girl might conceive the chief's child and be allowed to keep it.

Debate in the 19th and 20th centuries 
Scholars in the 19th and 20th centuries gave the historical basis of the "right of first night" a good deal of attention. Historians David M. Walker and Hector McKechnie wrote that the right might have existed in medieval Europe, but other historians have concluded that it is a myth, and that all references to it are from later periods. Over time, the Encyclopædia Britannica and the Larousse encyclopedias dramatically changed their opinion on the topic, moving from acceptance to rejection of the historical veracity of the idea. French writer Louis Veuillot wrote a book in 1854 disputing its existence. After an exhaustive historical study, German jurist Karl Schmidt concluded in 1881 that it was a scholarly misconception. After Schmidt, many of those who believed in the existence of the custom based their opinions on anthropological studies of tribal societies, though according to W. D. Howarth, this was a misguided argument because of the disparity between the tribal societies and medieval European society.

In The Origin of the Family, Private Property and the State in 1884, socialist Friedrich Engels argued it was real and had an anthropological origin.

In 1930, Scottish legal scholar Hector McKechnie concluded, based on historical evidence, that the practice had existed in Scotland in early times.

Italian scholar Paolo Mantegazza, in his 1935 book The Sexual Relations of Mankind, said that while not a law, it was most likely a binding custom.

See also
 Virgin cleansing myth, a belief that having sex with a virgin girl can cure certain diseases (notably AIDS) or otherwise conveys power to the man
 Non-paternity event
 Royal bastard
 Cuckoldry
 Childwite

Notes

References

Citations

Works cited
  Translation of: Le droit de cuissage: La fabrication d'un mythe (XIIIe–XXe siècle), Albin Michel

External links 

 The Straight Dope: Did medieval lords have "right of the first night" with the local brides? 
 Snopes: First Knight - A discussion of the droit du seigneur, or the 'right of the lord.'
 Jus primae noctis. Das Herrenrecht der ersten Nacht (in German), (in English)

Feudal duties
History of human sexuality
Medieval legends
Reproductive rights
Laws regarding rape
French legal terminology